The American Quarter Horse Hall of Fame and Museum was created by the American Quarter Horse Association (AQHA), based in Amarillo, Texas. Ground breaking construction of the Hall of Fame Museum began in 1989. The distinction is earned by people and horses who have contributed to the growth of the American Quarter Horse and "have been outstanding over a period of years in a variety of categories". In 1982, Bob Denhardt and Ernest Browning were the first individuals to receive the honor of being inducted into the AQHA Hall of Fame. In 1989, Wimpy P-1, King P-234, Leo and Three Bars were the first horses inducted into the AQHA Hall of Fame.

Museum
The American Quarter Horse Hall of Fame & Museum features photographs of honorees and paintings of American Quarter Horses famous in the bloodlines of current champions. Many of the paintings are by the western artist Orren Mixer. There are interactive exhibits about horse anatomy, horse riding and disciplines of the American Quarter Horse. Other displays include artifacts, riding and cowboy attire, tack, photos and ribbons and memorabilia about inductees.

Hall of Fame nominations
To be considered by the Hall of Fame, anyone may nominate either people or horses to be considered. Nominations from the membership are due by November 1. They are then screened and sent to the Hall of Fame committee which meets in the following March. Nominations stay active for three years, then must sit out for three years before being considered again. People being considered may be alive or deceased, but horses must be deceased.

Horses
List of horses currently inducted in the American Quarter Horse Association's Hall of Fame:

People

This list is incomplete.

See also
List of museums in the Texas Panhandle
List of historical horses

References

Other sources
 "Forever Famous" Quarter Horse Journal March 2001 p. 40-49
 "Hall of Fame Horses" Quarter Horse Journal May 1990 p. 48-49
 "Hall of Fame" Quarter Horse Journal March 2004 p. 42-53
 "Hall of Fame" Quarter Horse Journal March 2007 p. 42-55
 "Hall of Fame" Quarter Horse Journal March 2008 p. 43-55
 "MMIII" Quarter Horse Journal March 2003 p. 41-51
 "Seven Hall of Fame Inductees Honored at AQHA Convention Banquet" Quarter Horse Journal May 1989 p. 54-57
 Chamberlain, Richard; Campbell, Jim Bret "Hall of Fame" Quarter Horse Journal March 2005 p. 42-49
 Christensen, Kati "What Legends are Made of" Quarter Horse Journal March 1999 p. 40-47
 Glover, Diana "Hall of Fame Inductions Enter Second Decade" Quarter Horse Journal May 1993 p. 92-98
 Glover, Diana "Highest Honors" Quarter Horse Journal" March 1994 p. 72-79
 Huffman, Christi L. "They Earned a Place" Quarter Horse Journal March 1998 p. 68-75
 Jennings, Jim "1992 Hall of Fame inductees" Quarter Horse Journal May 1992 p. 66-69, 147
 Rusk, Rebecca "It Happened in 1989" Quarter Horse Journal January 1990 p. 68-69
 Wohlfarth, Jenny "'97 Brings Eleven" Quarter Horse Journal March 1997 p. 64-67
 Wohlfarth, Jenny "Heroes for the Hall" Quarter Horse Journal March 1996 p. 56-62
 Wohlfarth, Jenny "Keeping Tradition" Quarter Horse Journal'' March 1995 p. 68-73

External links
American Quarter Horse Hall of Fame & Museum
Overview of the Museum

Halls of fame in Texas
American Quarter Horse Association
AQHA Hall of Fame (horses)
AQHA Hall of Fame (members)
1989 establishments in Texas
Cowboy halls of fame
Equestrian museums in the United States
Horse racing museums and halls of fame
Museums in Amarillo, Texas